Buddy Fields was an important songwriter during the early twentieth century.  He was born on September 24, 1889 in Vienna, Austria-Hungary (which is now in Austria).  He died on October 4, 1965 in Detroit, Michigan in the United States of America.  His name at birth was Arthur B. Fields.   His most famous song "You Gotta Be a Football Hero" was cowritten with Al Sherman and Al Lewis.  Fields was both an author and agent having been educated in Chicago public schools.

World War I
During World War I, he served in the 133rd Machine Gun Battalion, 36th Division.

Music career
He appeared in vaudeville and cafes, then became a theatrical agent. Joining ASCAP in 1925, he collaborated musically with the likes of Al Sherman, Al Lewis, Gerald Marks and Art Berman.

Partial list of songwriting credits
"You Gotta Be a Football Hero"
 "Falling"
"You're the One, You Beautiful Son-of-a-Gun"
"The Night Shall Be Filled With Music"
"With You on My Mind I Can't Write the Words"
"By the Sign of the Rose"
"Chinnin' and Chattin' With May"
"The Pump Song"
"Remember"
"Indoor Outdoor Girl"
"By a Camp Fire"
"If It Wasn't for You"
"How Can I Be Anything but Blue"
"I'll Get Along Somehow".

1889 births
1965 deaths
American male songwriters
20th-century male musicians
Austro-Hungarian emigrants to the United States